Narasimha Naidu  is a 2001 Indian Telugu-language vigilante action drama film directed by B. Gopal. The film stars Nandamuri Balakrishna, Simran, Preeti Jhangiani, Asha Saini and musical score by Mani Sarma.

The film was released on 11 January 2001 alongside Venkatesh's Devi Putrudu and Chiranjeevi's Mrugaraju, to positive reviews, and was commercially successful, earning a distributor share of 30 crore on a budget of 6 — 9 crore, went on to become an Industry Hit. Balakrishna won Nandi Award for Best Actor for the film. It was remade into Tamil as Ezhumalai.

Plot
A feud between two neighboring villages ensues in Visakhapatnam district, where Raghupati Naidu and Appala Naidu are rivals. Since Raghupati Naidu is peace-loving person, their village is suppressed under the toe of malice Appala Naidu. He squats the fields of their Lakshmi Narasimha's  temple. Looking ahead, Raghupati Naidu plans to build an army for which he orders to sacrifice a male child from a family, and accords his younger son Narasimha Naidu. Years later, Anjali, who is the pampered daughter of a savage factionist Kuppuswamy Naidu, grows at her maternal uncle’s house. She is later inspired by Narasimha Naidu, who manages a dance school. Anjali joins as his student and develops feelings for him. Though aware that Narasimha Naidu is a widower and also has a kid still, Anjali stands firm, and gets closer to the kid, where he too reciprocates.

Meanwhile, Kuppuswamy Naidu fixes Anjali’s alliance with his nephew, who is the son of Appala Naidu. His sister Nagamani asks to butcher Narasimha Naidu, the one who assassinated her husband as a dowry. Anjali later declares her love for Narasimha Naidu Knowing this, the bridegroom moves to take hold of Anjali. Narasimha Naidu and Anjali boards the same train when the bridegroom's henchmen chase after them. At that point, a furious Narasimha Naidu reveals himself, where the henchen escape out of fear stating him as Narasimha Naidu. Later, Narasimha Naidu learns Anjali's identity and reveals his past.

15 years ago: After forming an army, Narasimha Naidu grows up as a gallant, who warns Appala Naidu to be on terms. On the eve of the celebrations, Appala Naidu onrushes when Narasimha Naidu slays him. Being cognizant of it, Kuppuswamy Naidu pledges to destroy Narasimha Naidu and his family. Currently, Raghupati Naidu decides to search a bride for Narasimha Naidu. He selects a generous Sravani, but she is sensitive to violence. Nevertheless, Raghupati Naidu conducts their marriage by concealing his son’s occupation, but Sravani realizes the fact and bends to his goodness.

One day, Narasimha Naidu's 3 siblings arrive from abroad along with their families who are conceited and negligent. However, Narasimha Naidu endears and adulation them a lot, but they always snide at him. Sravani fails to receive and retorts. Listening to this, Narasimha Naidu exiles her when she reaches her parents' house and gives birth to a boy. Later, Narasimha Naidu’s brothers are about to return without viewing the newborn baby and refuse to accompany them. En route, they are onslaught by Kuppuswamy Naidu’s men, but Narasimha Naidu secures his family keeping his life at risk, and safely sends off them. They realize his virtue and plead pardon after soul-searching. Simultaneously, Kuppuswamy Naidu attempts to kill Narasimha Naidu's son where Sravani is stabbed while guarding him. Before leaving her breath, she implores Narasimha Naidu to get rid of this climate which Raghupati Naidu also tells him to do so.

Present: Enraged, Kuppuswamy Naidu attacks Raghupati Naidu, but is struck seeing Narasimha Naidu (who has returned to his hometown). Narasimha Naidu hands over Anjali to him. During this, the kid spells his first words calling Anjali as his mother. Later, Raghupati Naidu initiates Narasimha Naidu to bring Anjali as a mother to his child. Anjali’s wedding arrangements are in progress, where Narasimha Naidu uproars Kuppuswamy Naidu fixing his match with Anjali and challenges him to block him. He cracks down on the day of the marriage, and perceives the presence of Anjali at the hospital, who has removed her uterus as a sacrifice not to have her progeny. At last, Narasimha Naidu wholeheartedly accepts and unites with Anjali.

Cast

Soundtrack

Mani Sharma composed the soundtrack of the film. Supreme Music Company purchased the musical rights of the film.

Awards
Nandi Awards - 2001
 Nandi Award for Best Actor – Nandamuri Balakrishna

Notes

References

External links 

2000s Telugu-language films
2001 films
Telugu films remade in other languages
2001 action drama films
2000s vigilante films
2000s masala films
Films directed by B. Gopal
Films scored by Mani Sharma
Films about feuds
Indian action drama films
Indian vigilante films